Citylink Plaza is a building that stands above Sha Tin station on the MTR East Rail line in Hong Kong. It was developed and is owned by the Kowloon-Canton Railway Corporation (KCRC). The building, as well as the railway station, is connected to New Town Plaza, which is one of the largest shopping centres in Sha Tin District.

History
The building originally housed the headquarters of the KCRC and some offices of the Hong Kong Government. It was called the KCR House when it opened in 1983. The shopping centre was called Railway Mall and was renamed Citylink Plaza after it was renovated at the end of 1993. The Hong Kong Government built a separate building near Grand Central Plaza to house the government offices, and the headquarters of the KCRC had moved to a new building next to Fo Tan station on the MTR East Rail line. The original building was refurbished and was converted into a shopping centre and offices.

Gallery

See also
 List of shopping centres in Hong Kong

References

External links

 Citylink Plaza, from MTRC

Kowloon-Canton Railway Corporation
MTR Corporation
Sha Tin
Shopping centres in Hong Kong